Carl XVI Gustaf (Carl Gustaf Folke Hubertus; born 30 April 1946) is King of Sweden. He ascended the throne on the death of his grandfather, Gustaf VI Adolf, on 15 September 1973.

He is the youngest child and only son of Prince Gustaf Adolf, Duke of Västerbotten, and Princess Sibylla of Saxe-Coburg and Gotha. His father died on 26 January 1947 in an airplane crash in Denmark when Carl Gustaf was nine months old. Upon his father's death, he became second in line to the throne, after his grandfather, the then Crown Prince Gustaf Adolf. Following the death of his great-grandfather, King Gustaf V, in 1950, Gustaf Adolf ascended the throne and thus Carl Gustaf became Sweden's new crown prince and heir apparent to the throne at the age of four.

Shortly after he became king in September 1973, the new 1974 Instrument of Government took effect, formally stripping Carl XVI Gustaf of his remaining executive power. As a result, he no longer performs many of the duties normally accorded to a head of state, such as the formal appointment of the prime minister, signing off on legislation, and being commander-in-chief of the nation's military. The new instrument explicitly limited the king to ceremonial functions and, among other things, to be regularly informed of affairs of state. As head of the House of Bernadotte, Carl Gustaf has also been able to make a number of decisions about the titles and positions of its members.

The King's heir apparent, after passage on 1 January 1980 of a new law establishing absolute primogeniture (the first such law passed in Western European history), is Crown Princess Victoria, the eldest child of the King and his wife, Queen Silvia. Before the passage of that law, Crown Princess Victoria's younger brother, Prince Carl Philip, was briefly the heir apparent, as of his birth in May 1979. Carl XVI Gustaf is the longest-reigning monarch in Swedish history, having surpassed King Magnus IV's reign of 44 years and 222 days on 26 April 2018.

Early life 
Carl Gustaf was born on 30 April 1946 at 10:20 in Haga Palace in Solna, Stockholm County. He was the youngest of five children and the only son of Sweden's Prince Gustaf Adolf and Princess Sibylla. He was christened at the Royal Chapel on 7 June 1946 by the Archbishop of Uppsala, Erling Eidem.

He was baptised in Charles XI's baptismal font, which stood on Gustav III's carpet; he lay in Charles XI's cradle with Oscar II's crown beside him. The same christening gown in white linen batiste which the prince carried had been worn by his father in 1906 and would later be worn by his three children. His godparents were the Crown Prince and Crown Princess of Denmark (his paternal uncle and aunt), the Crown Prince of Norway, Princess Juliana of the Netherlands, the King of Sweden (his paternal great-grandfather), the Hereditary Prince of Saxe-Coburg and Gotha (his maternal uncle), the Crown Prince and Crown Princess of Sweden (his paternal grandfather and step-grandmother), and Count Folke and Countess Maria Bernadotte af Wisborg.

Prince Carl Gustaf was also given the title of the Duke of Jämtland. His father, Prince Gustaf Adolf, Duke of Västerbotten, was killed in an airplane crash on 26 January 1947 at Copenhagen Airport. His father's death had left the nine-month-old prince second in line for the throne, behind his grandfather, then Crown Prince Gustaf Adolf. When his paternal great-grandfather, Gustaf V died in 1950, the four-year-old prince became the heir apparent of Sweden.

Carl Gustaf was seven years old before he was told about his father's death.  He expressed his feelings about growing up without knowing his father in a speech in 2005.

Youth and education 

His earliest education was received privately at the Royal Palace. The young prince was then sent to Broms school, and then on to Sigtuna boarding school. After graduating from high school in 1966, Carl Gustaf completed two-and-a-half years of education in the Swedish Army, the Royal Swedish Navy, and the Swedish Air Force. During the winter 1966–1967, he took part in a round-the-world voyage with the mine-laying vessel Älvsnabben. The Crown Prince received his commission as an officer in all three services in 1968, eventually rising to the rank of captain (in the army and air force) and lieutenant (in the navy), before his ascension to the throne. He also completed his academic studies in history, sociology, political science, tax law, and economics at Uppsala University and later economics at Stockholm University.

To prepare for his role as the head of state, Crown Prince Carl Gustaf followed a broad program of studies on the court system, social organisations and institutions, trade unions, and employers' associations. In addition, he closely studied the affairs of the Riksdag, Government, and Ministry for Foreign Affairs. The Crown Prince also spent time at the Swedish Mission to the United Nations and the Swedish International Development Cooperation Agency (SIDA), worked at a bank in London and at the Swedish Embassy there, at the Swedish Chamber of Commerce in France, and at the Alfa Laval Company factory in France. In 1970, he represented the King at the head of the Swedish delegation to the World Exposition in Osaka, Japan. Since his youth the present monarch has been a strong supporter of the Scout Movement in Sweden.

Carl Gustaf has dyslexia, as do his daughter Crown Princess Victoria and his son Prince Carl Philip.

Reign 
On 15 September 1973, Carl Gustaf became King of Sweden upon the death of his grandfather, Gustaf VI Adolf. On 19 September, he took the required regal assurance during an extraordinary meeting of the cabinet. Afterwards, he appeared before the parliament, diplomatic corps, court, etc. in the Hall of State at the Royal Palace where he gave a speech. Both the cabinet meeting and ceremony at the Hall were broadcast live on television. Following the ceremonies, he appeared on the balcony to acknowledge gathered crowds. At the cabinet meeting, the King declared that his regnal name would be Carl XVI Gustaf, King of Sweden. He adopted "For Sweden – With the times" as his personal motto (För Sverige – i tiden).

When Carl Gustaf ascended the throne, plans were already in place to replace the 1809 Instrument of Government, which made the King de jure chief executive. Though the King was a near-autocrat on paper, the Riksdag's authority grew steadily into the early 20th century, culminating in the definitive establishment of parliamentary government in 1917.

The new 1974 Instrument of Government first took effect on 1 January 1975 and formally stripped the new King of his remaining formal political powers, though these powers had effectively died with Carl Gustaf's great-grandfather, Gustaf V, in 1950. The new document made the King's role almost entirely ceremonial and representative in nature, while codifying a number of practices and conventions dating from 1917. Previously, the King formally appointed the Prime Minister, though in practice he was almost always the leader of the majority party or coalition in the Riksdag.  Since the adoption of the current Instrument, a prospective prime minister is nominated by the Speaker of the Riksdag, and if that candidate is elected by the Riksdag, the Speaker signs the commission. Additionally, bills passed by the Riksdag do not need royal assent to become law.

He is the foremost representative of Sweden and pays state visits abroad and receives those to Sweden, he opens the annual session of the Riksdag, chairs the Special Council held during a change of Government, holds regular Information Councils with the Prime Minister and the Cabinet, chairs the meetings of the Foreign Affairs Council, and receives Letters of Credence of foreign ambassadors to Sweden and signs those of Sweden to foreign nations. As a figurehead, he also voluntarily abstains from voting in Swedish elections.

King Carl Gustaf holds the highest ranks in the three branches of the Swedish Armed Forces; this is due to the fact that he was, as stipulated by § 14 of the 1809 Instrument of Government in effect at the time of his accession to the throne in 1973, the Commander-in-Chief (not to be confused with the military professional holding the position of Supreme Commander) and therefore he was promoted ex officio from his earlier ranks of captain (Army & Air Force) and lieutenant (Navy), to general and admiral. Under the provisions of the Instrument of Government of 1974, which became effective on 1 January 1975, the King no longer holds this constitutionally-mandated position, but he kept his ranks à la suite since he no longer has any military command authority, except over His Majesty's Military Staff.

Worldwide, Carl XVI Gustaf is probably best known as the presenter of the Nobel Prizes each year; the first Nobel laureate who received the prize from his hands was Leo Esaki. He also hands over the Polar Music Prize. The King holds honorary doctoral degrees from the Swedish University of Agricultural Sciences,  KTH Royal Institute of Technology, the Stockholm School of Economics and from the Åbo Akademi University in Finland.

The King's Golden Jubilee will be celebrated in 2023.

Personal interests and views

The king is passionate about the environment, technology, agriculture, trade, and industry. Like many members of the Swedish royal family, he has a keen interest in automobiles. He owns several Porsche 911s, a car model which is said to be a particular favourite of his, as well as a vintage Volvo PV444, a Ferrari 456M GT, an AC Cobra and other cars. The first pictures taken of him and his future wife were of them sitting in his Porsche 911. In the summer of 2005 he was involved in a traffic accident in Norrköping. The accident was described as a "fender bender", with no serious personal injuries claimed. Nevertheless, the incident caused national headlines. The king and queen of Sweden frequently travel to the Summer and Winter Olympic Games, including in 2014, 2016 and 2018.

In December 2020, the king said Sweden's approach to dealing with COVID-19 had failed. Prime Minister Stefan Löfven said that "the fact that so many have died can't be considered as anything other than a failure".

Scouting 
The King is the honorary chairman of the World Scout Foundation, and often participates in Scout activities both in Sweden and abroad. He regularly visits World Scout Jamborees, for instance the 1979 Dalajamb World Jamboree International Encampment hosted by Sweden, the 2002 World Jamboree held in Sattahip, Thailand, and the 100th Anniversary of World Scouting 2007 World Jamboree held in Hylands Park, England. He also attended the 1981 National Scout Jamboree in Virginia, United States, and was awarded the Bronze Wolf, the only distinction of the World Organization of the Scout Movement, awarded by the World Scout Committee for exceptional services to world Scouting, in 1982. He also attended the 22nd World Scout Jamboree. He gave a speech on 6 August 2011 at the closing ceremony with more than 40,000 people watching. The band Europe also performed for him singing "The Final Countdown". King Carl Gustaf made an appearance at the 2013 Boy Scouts of America National Jamboree in West Virginia.

Use of remaining power 

So empowered as head of the House of Bernadotte, King Carl Gustaf since he was enthroned in 1973 has made a number of personal decisions regarding the titles and positions of relatives and family members, including the demotion of a sister, elevation of several commoners to royalty, rebuff of an elderly uncle's wishes and the creation of new Swedish titles and duchies.
 1974: his sister Christina married a non-royal Swedish man and Carl Gustaf followed the example which his grandfather and predecessor had set for two of Christina's older sisters with like marriages, so Christina was removed from the Royal House, no longer a Royal Highness and was given the courtesy title Princess Christina, Mrs. Magnuson (a special non-royal, non-noble style first invented in 1953 by King Haakon VII of Norway for his granddaughter Ragnhild).
 1976: his own choice, taking advantage of his constitutional prerogative as king when he married a non-royal German-Brazilian woman, saw her created Her Majesty Queen Silvia of Sweden.
 1976: his paternal uncle Bertil (later that year) married the non-royal British woman who had lived with Bertil for decades, and (with Bertil's titles) Carl Gustaf created her a Royal Highness Princess of Sweden and Duchess of Halland.
 1977: his daughter Victoria was born, and in 1980, Carl Gustaf created her Duchess of Västergötland (which has had duchesses before).
 1979: his son Carl Philip was born, and Carl Gustaf created him Duke of Värmland (which has had dukes before).
 1982: his daughter Madeleine was born, and Carl Gustaf created a new duchy for her as Duchess of Hälsingland and Gästrikland.
 1983: his paternal uncle Sigvard, since 1934 no longer Prince of Sweden because of a non-royal marriage to a German woman, supported by legal experts announced his own title as Prince Sigvard Bernadotte, 18 years later clearly citing a great-uncle Prince Oscar Bernadotte's title as his main precedent; however, Sigvard died in 2002 with Carl Gustaf never having responded to his uncle's statement, and with the Royal Court of Sweden consistently refusing to honor it.
 2003: his paternal grandfather's first cousin Carl died, and Carl Gustaf formally recognized his Belgian title by allowing Prince Carl Bernadotte on the gravestone at the Royal Cemetery which is owned by the king; in 2014 he did the same there, allowing Carl's widow's name as Princess Kristine Bernadotte when she died.
 2010: his daughter Victoria married a non-royal Swede whom Carl Gustaf created a Royal Highness Prince of Sweden and (with her title) Duke of Västergötland.
 2012: his granddaughter Estelle was born and created Duchess of Östergötland (which has had duchesses before).
 2013: his daughter Madeleine married a non-royal British American who declined Swedish citizenship, and Carl Gustaf gave him the special courtesy title of Herr (with a capital h).
 2014: his granddaughter Leonore was born and created Duchess of Gotland (which also previously has been a duchy).
 2015: his son Carl Philip married a non-royal Swede whom Carl Gustaf created a Royal Highness Princess of Sweden and (with the son's title) Duchess of Värmland.
 2015: his grandson Nicolas was born, and Carl Gustaf created a new duchy for him as Duke of Ångermanland.
 2016: his grandson Oscar was born and created Duke of Scania (which has had dukes before).
 2016: his grandson Alexander was born (later that year) and created Duke of Södermanland (which has had dukes before).
 2017: his grandson Gabriel was born and created Duke of Dalarna (which has had dukes before).
 2018: his granddaughter Adrienne was born, and Carl Gustaf created a new duchy for her as Duchess of Blekinge.
 2019: Carl Gustaf issued a statement rescinding the royal status of his grandchildren Leonore, Nicolas, Alexander, Gabriel and Adrienne in an effort to more strictly associate Swedish royalty to the office of the head of state; the five are still to be styled as princes/princesses and dukes/duchesses of their provinces, and they remain in the line of succession to the throne.
 2021: his grandson Julian was born and created Duke of Halland (which has had dukes before) with the same standing of 2019 as his brothers.

Marriage and family 

The King married Silvia Sommerlath, whose father was German and whose mother was Brazilian, and who had grown up in both countries. They met at the 1972 Summer Olympics in Munich, where she was an interpreter and host. The wedding was held on 19 June 1976 at Stockholm Cathedral, the ceremony performed by the Archbishop of Uppsala, Olof Sundby. The wedding was preceded the previous evening by a Royal Variety Performance, at which, among other performances, the Swedish musical group ABBA gave one of the first performances of "Dancing Queen", as a tribute to Sweden's future queen. The King and his family moved to Drottningholm Palace west of Stockholm in 1980. He and the Queen have maintained their business offices at the Royal Palace of Stockholm.

King Carl Gustaf and Queen Silvia have three children and eight grandchildren:
Crown Princess Victoria, Duchess of Västergötland (born 14 July 1977), who is married to Daniel Westling and has two children
Prince Carl Philip, Duke of Värmland (born 13 May 1979), who is married to Sofia Hellqvist and has three children
Princess Madeleine, Duchess of Hälsingland and Gästrikland, (born 10 June 1982), who is married to Christopher O'Neill and has three children

Prince Carl Philip was born the heir apparent. However, a constitutional reform, which was already under way at the time of his birth, made his elder sister, Victoria, the heir apparent and Crown Princess of Sweden on 1 January 1980, according to the principles of absolute primogeniture, which Sweden was the first recognised monarchy to adopt. King Carl Gustaf objected after the reform, not to the succession by females but to the fact that his son lost the position and title which he had had since birth.

Health 
In February 2023, Carl Gustaf underwent "a surgical intervention with catheter technology in the heart area."

Titles, styles, honours and arms 
Gustaf VI Adolf was the last king to use the style "by the Grace of God, of the Swedes, Goths and Wends King". This title had been in use since its adoption by Gustav I in 1523. Carl XVI Gustaf instead chose the simpler "King of Sweden" (Sveriges Konung), thereby ending a centuries-old tradition.

Regnal name 
There have not actually been sixteen kings of Sweden named Carl/Charles. The numeral stems from an erroneous genealogy that includes fictitious kings, created by 16th-century writer Johannes Magnus.

Arms 
On his creation as Duke of Jämtland, Carl XVI Gustaf was granted an achievement of arms which featured the arms of Jämtland in base (these arms can be seen on his stallplate as knight of the Danish Order of the Elephant at Frederiksborg Palace). Since his accession to the throne, he has used the greater coat of arms of Sweden although he is still associated with the ducal title of Jämtland.

Distinctions

National 
 : Recipient of the 90th Birthday Medal of King Gustaf V
 : Recipient of the 85th Birthday Medal of King Gustaf VI Adolf
 : Recipient of the Wedding Medal of Crown Princess Victoria to Daniel Westling

Foreign 
 : Grand Cross with Collar of the Order of the Liberator General San Martín (1998)
 : Grand Star of the Order of Honour for Services to the Republic of Austria, Special Class (1967)
 : Grand Cordon of the Order of Leopold (1977)
 : Grand Collar of the Order of the Southern Cross (2007)
 : Recipient of the Royal Family Order of the Crown of Brunei (2004)
 : Sash of the Order of Stara Planina
 : Collar of the Order of Merit
 : Grand Cross of the Grand Order of King Tomislav (2013)
 :
 Knight with Collar of the Order of the Elephant (12 January 1965)
 Grand Commander of the Order of the Dannebrog (1975)
 : Grand Cross with Collar of the Order of the Nile
 :
 Grand Cross with Collar of the Order of the Cross of Terra Mariana (1995)
 Grand Cross with Collar of the Order of the White Star (2011)
 : Grand Cross with Collar of the Order of the White Rose (1974)
 : Grand Cross of the Order of the Legion of Honour
 :
 Grand Cross Special Class of the Order of Merit of the Federal Republic of Germany
  Ducal Family of Saxe-Coburg and Gotha: Knight Grand Cross of the Ducal Royal Saxe-Ernestine Saxe-Coburg and Gotha House Order
 : Grand Cross of the Order of the Redeemer
 : Knight with the Collar of the Order of Pope Pius IX
 : Grand Cross of the Order of Merit of the Republic of Hungary
 : Grand Cross with Collar of the Order of the Falcon
 : Star of the Republic of Indonesia, 1st Class (2017)
 : Grand Cross with Collar of the Order of Merit of the Italian Republic (1991)
 : Collar of the Order of the Chrysanthemum
 : Grand Cordon with Collar of the Order of al-Hussein bin Ali
 :
 Grand Cross with Chain of the Order of the Three Stars (1995)
 Grand Cross of the Order of Viesturs
 : Grand Cross with Golden Chain of the Order of Vytautas the Great (1995)
 : Knight Grand Cross of the Order of the Gold Lion of the House of Nassau
 : Honorary Recipient of the Order of the Crown of the Realm (1996)
 : Collar of the Order of the Aztec Eagle (2004)
 :
 Knight Grand Cross of the Order of the Netherlands Lion
 Knight Grand Cross of the Order of the House of Orange
 Commander of the Order of the Golden Ark
 : Knight Grand Cross with Collar of the Order of St. Olav (1974)
 : Knight of the Order of the White Eagle
 :
 Grand Collar of the Order of Saint James of the Sword
 Grand Cross with Collar of the Order of Prince Henry (1987)
 : Grand Cross with Collar of the Order of the Star of Romania (2003)
 : Grand Cross with Collar of the Order of Abdulaziz al Saud
 : First Class of the Order of the White Double Cross
 : Recipient of the Decoration for Exceptional Merits
 : Grand Cross with Collar of the Order of Good Hope (1997)
 : Recipient of the Grand Order of Mugunghwa (2012)
 :
 1,183rd Knight of the Order of the Golden Fleece (1983)
 Knight Grand Cross with Collar of the Order of Charles III
 : 
 Knight of the Order of the Rajamitrabhorn (2003)
 Knight of the Order of Ramkeerati (2008)
 : Grand Cordon of the Order of the Republic
 : Collar of the Order of the State of Republic of Turkey (2013)
 :
 Member of the Order of Liberty (2008)
 Grand Cross with Collar of the Order of Prince Yaroslav the Wise
 Grand Officer of the Order of Merit, 1st Class
 :
 963rd Knight of the Most Noble Order of the Garter (1983)
 Recipient of the Royal Victorian Chain (8 July 1975)
 : Order of the Yugoslav Great Star (1976)

Awards

Foreign 
 United Nations Peace Medal (1976)
 World Organization of the Scout Movement: Bronze Wolf Award (1982)
 : Golden Pheasant Award of the Scout Association of Japan (1980)
 : Mount Makiling Award

Honorary military positions 
  Honorary Admiral, British Royal Navy (seniority: 25 June 1975)

Patronages

Ancestry

Notes

Explanatory footnotes

References

External links 
 Royal Court of Sweden – Official site

|-

|-

|-

1946 births
20th-century Swedish monarchs
21st-century Swedish monarchs
Crown Princes of Sweden
Dukes of provinces of Sweden
Charles 16 Gustav
Living people
People from Solna Municipality
Royal Navy admirals
Scouting and Guiding in Sweden
Swedish Navy admirals
Swedish Army generals
Swedish Air Force generals
Swedish Lutherans
Swedish monarchs of German descent
Swedish people of French descent
Uppsala University alumni

Commanders Grand Cross of the Order of the Polar Star
Commanders Grand Cross of the Order of the Sword
Grand Crosses of the Order of Vasa
Knights of the Order of Charles XIII
Grand Masters of the Order of Charles XIII

Collars of the Order of the Liberator General San Martin
Extra Knights Companion of the Garter
Grand Commanders of the Order of the Dannebrog
Grand Croix of the Légion d'honneur
Grand Collars of the Order of Prince Henry
Grand Collars of the Order of Saint James of the Sword
Grand Crosses of the Order of the House of Orange
Grand Crosses with Golden Chain of the Order of Vytautas the Great
Knights of the Golden Fleece of Spain
Knights Grand Cross with Collar of the Order of Merit of the Italian Republic
Recipients of the Order of the Liberator General San Martin
Recipients of the Bronze Wolf Award
Recipients of the Collar of the Order of the Cross of Terra Mariana
Knights Grand Cross of the Order of Pope Pius IX
Recipients of the Grand Star of the Decoration for Services to the Republic of Austria
Recipients of the Order of Prince Yaroslav the Wise, 1st class
Grand Crosses Special Class of the Order of Merit of the Federal Republic of Germany
Royalty and nobility with dyslexia
First Class of the Order of the Star of Romania
Recipients of the Order of the White Eagle (Poland)